Krzywda is a Polish coat of arms. It was used by several szlachta families. The homeland of this coat of arms is probably the village Krzywda in Podlaskie.

History
There are two legends of how this coat of arms appeared:

The first says one of two (or three) brothers of the Lubicz clan did wrong (krzywda) to the other with respect to his portion of their inheritance, and as a result half of one cross was taken from his coat of arms and the new coat of arms was called Krzywda (which translates from Polish as "injustice", "grief"). Polish: "Gdy jeden Lubicz przy majątkowym działe brata skrzywdził, utracił za to jedno ramie górniego krzyża."

The other version says the missing arm was based on a rule that "The first man to touch a certain piece of land, could claim it". Someone named Bogucki was in a boat looking for the land, and there were many other boats around him. When he feared others might get to the land first, he cut off his arm, threw it to the land, and claimed it as his.

Blazon
In Polish blazon sounds like: W polu błękitnym podkowa srebrna ocelami w dół zwrócona. W środku niej krzyż kawalerski złoty. Na niej umieszczony krzyż kawalerski złoty bez prawego ramienia. W klejnocie nad hełmem w koronie trzy pióra strusie.
In English: Azure, within a silver horseshoe ensiegned with a cross pattée sans its right arm, a cross patee both crosses Or. Crest: three ostrich plumes Argent.
In other words, on a blue field there is a silver horseshoe (pointed down) with a gold knight's cross inside it, and another knight's cross missing its right arm on top of it.

Notable bearers
Notable bearers of this coat of arms include:

 Stanisław Moniuszko
Alexandre-Édouard Kierzkowski
 House of Krasnodębski
 Janusz Feliks Ratyński
 Zygmunt Stanisław Ratyński
 Levko Revutsky
 House of Rzewuski
 Wacław Rzewuski
 Ewelina Rzewuska
 Teresa Karolina Rzewuska
 Maria Ludwika Rzewuska
 Seweryn Rzewuski
 Stanisław Mateusz Rzewuski

Some people of this armorial clan received some titles from other counties. For example:
 Jósef Felix Łasowski – the  title of Baron of the French Empire (15 August 1809)
 Kazimierz Rzewuski –  the title of Count of Austria (21 April 1819)
 Alexander Soszyński – the title of dvoryanin of Russia (1860)
 and various other members of the latter family received countly titles from Austria and Russia.

Related coat of arms
 Lubicz coat of arms

See also
 Polish heraldry
 Heraldic family
 List of Polish nobility coats of arms

Bibliography
 Ród Krasnodębskich Herbu Krzywda. Szkic Heraldyczno-Historyczny Ze Źródeł Archiwalnych. Author: Aleksander Włodarski Kustosz Archiwum Głównego, strona: wstęp do opracowania, Warszawa 1927, Druk Piotra Laskauera
 Tadeusz Gajl: Herbarz polski od średniowiecza do XX wieku : ponad 4500 herbów szlacheckich 37 tysięcy nazwisk 55 tysięcy rodów. L&L, 2007, s. 406-539. .

References

External links
 http://gajl.wielcy.pl/herby_nazwiska.php?lang=pl&herb=krzywda

Polish coats of arms